Helgeson is a surname. Notable people with the surname include:

Donald K. Helgeson (1932–1976), American politician
Hal Helgeson (1931–2007), American geochemist
Miner A. Helgeson (1884–1950), American farmer and politician
Seth Helgeson (born 1990), American ice hockey player
Ginger Helgeson-Nielsen (born 1968), American former tennis player